Mercer Hall is a historic mansion in Columbia, Maury County, Tennessee, USA.

History
The mansion was built in 1838 for William Leacock, an Episcopal pastor.

Heritage significance
It has been listed on the National Register of Historic Places since December 16, 1982.

References

Houses on the National Register of Historic Places in Tennessee
Houses in Columbia, Tennessee
Houses completed in 1838
National Register of Historic Places in Maury County, Tennessee